Subang–Kelana Jaya Link, Federal Route 15, is an elevated highway in Subang Jaya, Selangor, Malaysia. The highway connected from Persiaran Kewajipan to the Sultan Abdul Aziz Shah Airport Highway and Federal Highway. This elevated highway was constructed on 2005 by the Malaysian Public Works Department (JKR) and the main contractor Ahmad Zaki Resources Berhad (AZRB) and it was opened in 2009. It is the tallest elevated highway in Subang Jaya.

List of interchanges

Highways in Malaysia
Expressways and highways in the Klang Valley